National Route 289 is an incomplete national highway in Japan that will eventually connect central Niigata with Iwaki, Fukushima with a total length of .

At present, work is underway to complete an  central section that will join the eastern and western portions together through the very northern part of the Japanese Alps on Niigata's and Fukushima's prefectural border.

When finished, traffic will be able to travel coast to coast across Japan in a link between the Sea of Japan and Pacific.

Sections

Niigata
The western part of Route 289 begins in Yoshida passing east through the towns of Tsubame and Sanjo. It currently ends in the mountains 10 km south east of Shitada village.

Fukushima
The eastern part of Route 289 starts in Iwaki, Fukushima near Nakoso Station. It then heads west through Shirakawa and passed Shinshirakawa. It currently ends 12 km north west of Nishigō village.

Central part
Work to join the east and west sections began in 1999. But the scheme suffered a major setback after the Chūetsu earthquake in 2004 when landslips covered large parts of the route. In 2005/06 efforts were made to clear these blockages and restart building work.

The finished route, which presently is a dirt track and is only passable by 4x4s or construction traffic, will include several spanned bridges, avalanche covers and a 1.5 km tunnel.

A provisional completion date was given as 2012 but that has since lapsed.

References

External links
 Tunnel Completion (In Japanese)  

National highways in Japan
Roads in Fukushima Prefecture
Roads in Niigata Prefecture